MLA may refer to:

Arts and entertainment 
 M.L.A. (1957 film), an Indian Telugu-language film by K. B. Tilak
 MLA (2018 Kannada film), an Indian film by Mourya Manjunath
 MLA (2), an Indian film by Upendra Madhav
 Muv-Luv Alternative

Business 
 Mandated Lead Arranger, a bank in charge of organizing a syndicated loan
 McKenna Long & Aldridge, a United States-based international law and public policy firm

Government and politics
 Member of the Legislative Assembly, a politician serving in a legislature, in many countries
 Member of the Legislative Assembly (India)
 Member of the Legislative Assembly (Northern Ireland)

Organizations 
 Massachusetts Lobstermen's Association
 Master Locksmiths Association, United Kingdom
 Meat and Livestock Australia, Australian not-for-profit organisation of red meat producers
 Modern Language Association,  United States of America
 MLA Handbook, published by the association, replacing MLA Style Manual

Library organizations 
 Maine Library Association, professional association for librarians in Maine
 Maryland Library Association, professional association for librarians in Maryland
 Massachusetts Library Association, professional association for librarians in Massachusetts
 Medical Library Association, United States
 Michigan Library Association, professional association for librarians in Michigan
 Minnesota Library Association, professional association for librarians in Minnesota
 Mississippi Library Association, professional association for librarians in Mississippi
 Montana Library Association, professional association for librarians in Montana
 Museums, Libraries and Archives Council, United Kingdom
 Music Library Association, United States

Professions and degrees 
 Master of Landscape Architecture, a professional qualification 
 Master of Liberal Arts, a master's degree 
 Medical Laboratory Assistant, an assistant to a biomedical scientist

Other 
 Malaysia, ITU country code
 Malta International Airport, IATA airport code
 Mercury Laser Altimeter, an instrument on MESSENGER space probe
 Methyllycaconitine, a nicotinic acetylcholine receptor antagonist
 Mobile Location Analytics, a type of customer intelligence
 Montessori Lyceum Amsterdam, a school in Amsterdam, Netherlands
 Mutual legal assistance treaty, an agreement between two countries for the purpose of gathering and exchanging information in an effort to enforce public laws or criminal laws
 Tamambo language, ISO 639 language code
 Micro lens array, see as well Holographic optical element, Light field camera